Bez-MX is a 1981 video game published by Bez.

Gameplay
Bez-MX is a game in which two players attack each other within missiles and bombers in a hybrid of strategy and arcade game.

Reception
Luther Shaw reviewed the game for Computer Gaming World, and stated that "The pure arcadist will probably not find Bez-MX his cup of tea but for those of you who like strategy games with a little arcade flavor, at [the price] Bez-MX is worth considering."

References

External links
Review in Softalk

1981 video games
Apple II games
Apple II-only games
Computer wargames
Multiplayer video games
Turn-based strategy video games
Video games about nuclear war and weapons
Video games developed in the United States